Martin L. Hoffman was an American psychologist and a professor emeritus of clinical and developmental psychology at New York University.

In his career, Hoffman is primarily focused on development of empathy and its relationship with moral development, which he defines as "people's consideration for others."  His research also touches on areas such as empathic anger, sympathy, guilt and feelings of injustice.

Hoffman did his undergraduate studies at Purdue University, receiving a B.S. in electrical engineering in 1945. He earned a master's degree in psychology at the University of Michigan in 1947 and a PhD in social psychology at the University of Michigan in 1951. In the 1960s, he became editor of the Merrill-Palmer Quarterly, and oversaw its conversion from a newsletter to an academic journal.

He is a fellow of the American Association for the Advancement of Science, the American Psychological Association, and the American Psychological Society.

Books

References

Living people
20th-century American psychologists
University of Michigan alumni
New York University faculty
Fellows of the American Association for the Advancement of Science
Fellows of the American Psychological Association
Fellows of the Association for Psychological Science
American developmental psychologists
Year of birth missing (living people)
American social psychologists
American textbook writers
American clinical psychologists